Blue Falcon is a character in the animated series Dynomutt, Dog Wonder.

Blue Falcon may also refer to:

Captain Falcon's vehicle in the video game series F-Zero
"How Ian Direach got the Blue Falcon", a Scots folk tale